Hans Schmid (born 24 June 1948) is a Swiss ski jumper. He competed at the 1972 Winter Olympics and the 1976 Winter Olympics.

References

1948 births
Living people
Swiss male ski jumpers
Olympic ski jumpers of Switzerland
Ski jumpers at the 1972 Winter Olympics
Ski jumpers at the 1976 Winter Olympics
Place of birth missing (living people)